Amanda Lear is a French/Vietnamese singer, lyricist, painter, television presenter, actress and former model. She began her professional career as a fashion model in the mid-1960s. Around that time she met the Spanish surrealist painter Salvador Dalí and would remain his closest friend and muse for the next 15 years. From the mid-1970s to the early 1980s, she was a million-album-selling disco queen, mainly in Continental Europe and Scandinavia, signed to Ariola Records. Her best-selling album is Sweet Revenge and her biggest hits include "Blood and Honey", "Tomorrow", "Queen of Chinatown", "Follow Me", "Enigma (Give a Bit of Mmh to Me)", "The Sphinx" and "Fashion Pack".

By the mid-1980s, Lear had positioned herself as one of the leading media personalities in Italy, thanks to media tycoon Silvio Berlusconi, who offered her hosting the prime time entertainment show Premiatissima on the newly launched Canale 5. She then went on to host the popular show W le donne in Italy, adapted in France as Cherchez la femme, and Ars Amanda on the national Italian network RAI. Since the 1990s, her time has been divided between music, television, movies and painting. Despite regular album releases, she failed to achieve major success in charts with her music. However, her television career has remained stellar and she has hosted numerous successful TV shows, mostly in Italy and France, such as Il brutto anatroccolo and Cocktail d'amore. Lear has occasionally made guest appearances in French and Italian TV series. She has also performed acting and dubbing roles in independent as well as major film productions.

TV shows

TV series

Feature films

Short films

Dubbing

References

External links 
 Official website
 
 Amanda Lear at AllMovie

Actress filmographies
French filmographies